Pyrene obtusa is a species of sea snail, a marine gastropod mollusk in the family Columbellidae, the dove snails.

Description
The shell size varies between 11 mm and 18 mm

The small shell is pretty thin, ovate, conical and smooth. It is of a diaphanous white. The sutures are indistinctly apparent. The spire is composed of six convex whorls, ornamented at their base with spots of a duller white. The body whorl is as large as all the others, striated at base, and surrounded, towards the middle, with small, distant spots, articulated by a reddish line. The aperture is ovate. The outer lip denticulated within, and thickened outwardly, even to the base of the shell.

Distribution
This species occurs in the Indian Ocean off East Africa and Mauritius and Réunion and in the Indo-West Pacific; off Australia (Queensland)

References

  Sowerby, G.B. (1st) 1832. Descriptions of new species of shells collected by Mr. Cuming. Proceedings of the Zoological Society of London 1832(2): 113–120
 Duclos, P.L. 1840. Histoire naturelle generale et particuliere de tous genres de coquilles univalves marines a l'état vivant et fossile publiee par monographie. Genre Columbelle. Paris : Didot. 
 Souverbie, M. & Montrouzier, R.P. 1865. Descriptions d'espèces nouvelles de l'Archipel Calédonien. Journal de Conchyliologie 13: 150–159, pl. 5 
 Schmeltz, J.D.K. 1874. Museum Godeffroy Catalog 5. Hamburg : L. Friederichsen & Co. 215 pp.
 Drivas, J. & Jay, M. 1990. The Columbellidae of Réunion Island (Mollusca: Gastropoda). Annals of the Natal Museum 31: 163–200
 Michel, C. (1988). Marine molluscs of Mauritius. Editions de l'Ocean Indien. Stanley, Rose Hill. Mauritius 
 Wilson, B. 1994. Australian Marine Shells. Prosobranch Gastropods. Kallaroo, WA : Odyssey Publishing Vol. 2 370 pp.
 Kilburn R.N. & Marais J.P. (2010) Columbellidae. Pp. 60-104, in: Marais A.P. & Seccombe A.D. (eds), Identification guide to the seashells of South Africa. Volume 1. Groenkloof: Centre for Molluscan Studies. 376 pp.

External links
 

Columbellidae
Gastropods described in 1832